Neaporia is a genus of beetles belonging to the family Coccinellidae.

Species:
 Neaporia metallica  Gorham, 1897

References

Coccinellidae
Coccinellidae genera